The Bodines were a British rock group from the mid to late 1980s that consisted of guitarist Paul Brotherton, bassist Tim Burwood, drummer John Rowlands, and guitarist/vocalist Michael Ryan.

History
The Bodines, consisting of Mike Ryan, Paul Brotherton, Tim Burtonwood and Paul Lilley, emerged from Glossop, Derbyshire, England, in 1985. Fronted by the floppy-fringed Ryan, they became one of the better-known outfits from a crop of jangly indie bands that sprang up around that time. They made their debut with "God Bless", an early release by Creation Records.  Shortly afterwards, Lilley was replaced on drums by John Rowland. Two further singles followed; their second, "Therese", was included on the C86 compilation album. Like their contemporaries Primal Scream, the Mighty Lemon Drops and the Weather Prophets, the Bodines went on to sign up with a major label with great hopes of transferring their success to the mainstream charts. The group joined Magnet Records, where a remix of "Therese" became their major label debut.

In July 1986, the Bodines participated in the Festival of the Tenth Summer. The Bodines's debut album, Played (produced by Ian Broudie, later to enjoy success as a recording artist as the Lightning Seeds) scraped into No. 94 in the UK Albums Chart, in the summer of 1987. None of the Bodines' singles got into the UK Singles Chart. Under pressure for failing to deliver the hit record that their major label backers required, the Bodines split up, albeit temporarily. Rowland went on to play with The Rainkings.
 
In 1989, a reformed line-up of Ryan, Brotherton, new bassist Ian Watson, and new drummer Spencer Birtwistle released the single "Decide" on Manchester's Play Hard label and contributed a further new track to the same label's Hand to Mouth compilation. A couple of years later, Ryan reappeared with a new band called Medalark Eleven (misnamed after Harlem Globetrotters' Meadowlark Lemon), assisted by Gareth Thomas on bass and Adrian Donohue on drums. Reunited with Creation Records, they released a couple of singles ahead of the album Shaped Up, Shipped Out.

On 23 August 2010, the Bodines debut album Played was reissued with seven bonus tracks on the Cherry Red label.

Discography
Chart placings shown from UK Indie Chart.

Singles
"God Bless" 7" b/w "Paradise" Creation Records CRE 016 1986  No. 8
"Therese" 7" & 12" b/w "I Feel", "Scar Tissue" Creation Records CRE 028, CRE 028T 1986  No. 4
"Heard It All" 7" & 12" b/w "Heard It All", "Clear", "William Shatner" Creation Records CRE 030, CRE 030T 1986  No. 4
"Therese" 7" & 12" b/w "Heard It All" Magnet Records BOD1, BODT1 1987
"Skankin Queens" 7" & 12" b/w "My Remarkable Mind" Magnet Records BOD2, BODT2 1987
"Slip Slide" 7" & 12" b/w "Naming Names", "Long Time Dead" Magnet Records BOD3, BODT3 1987
"Decide" 12"b/w "Hard On", "The Groove" Play Hard Records 18 December 1989  No. 15
"Shrinkwrap" CD-Single b/w "With You", "Wake Me Up And Smell The Coffee" Firestation Records FST 073 2007

Albums
Played (1987 – Magnet Records BODL 2001)

Side A
"Skankin Queens"
"What You Want"
"Scar Tissue"
"Tall Stories"
"Clear"

Side B
"Untitled"
"Therese"
"Slip Slide"
"The Back Door"
"William Shatner"

The Japanese release (Cat. No. VDP-1319) contained two extra tracks: "Therese" (New Extended Mix) and "Heard It All".

Compilation appearances
NME C86 Compilation NME 22 Contributed "Therese". Free with the NME Weekly Music paper. Was also released as a 500 numbered promo was released for radio with the number NME Pro 1. It was later released with a different sleeve on Rough Trade with the number ROUGH 100. 1986
It's Different For Domeheads Creation CRELP 5 Contributed "Paradise"
Record Mirror 12". Free release with the Record Mirror Magazine on Ensign RM6. Contributed "Back Door (live)" 1986
Flowers In The Sky 1984–1987 Creation CRELP 028 CD Contributed "God Bless"
Creation Soup Volume 2 Creation CRECD 102 (on vinyl as CRELP 102) Contributed "God Bless", "Paradise"
Creation Soup Volume 3 Creation CRECD 103 (on vinyl as CRELP 103) Contributed "William Shatner"
Hand To Mouth Playhard Contributed "Hard On" and "Call Your Name"

Other releases
"William Shatner" Canadian Live Bootleg (7") Label Unknown BODX1 This was free with BODT1

Personnel
Core line-up
Michael Ryan – vocals, guitar
Paul Brotherton – guitar
Tim Burwood – bass guitar
John Rowland – drums

Other members
Paul Lilley – drums
Ian Watson – bass guitar
Spencer Birtwistle – drums
Andrew "Booty" Boot – guitar

References

External links
Slip Slide – The Bodines by Tom Bartlett
The Bodines by Bird Poo

English rock music groups
Creation Records artists
People from Glossop